The East End Dwellings Company was a Victorian philanthropic model dwellings company, operating in the East End of London in the latter part of the nineteenth century. The company was founded in principle in 1882 by, among others, Samuel Augustus Barnett, vicar of St Jude's Church, Whitechapel; it was finally incorporated in 1884.

Its aim was to "house the very poor while realizing some profit", "their particular purpose being to erect blocks of dwellings, to be let by the room, so that the poorest class of labourers could be accommodated". Unlike many of the model dwellings companies, the EEDC offered accommodation to the casual poor and day labourers.

The company's first venture was Katharine Buildings in Aldgate, followed by a number of schemes in Bethnal Green, London. They went on to build around the East End. Along the principles of Octavia Hill's schemes, the company used female rent-collectors, including Beatrice Potter (later Webb), one of the founders of the London School of Economics & Political Science and Ella Pycroft, who ran the Buildings alongside Maurice Eden Paul.

Buildings

Katharine Buildings - Cartwright Street, Aldgate
Museum House - Green Street, Bethnal Green (1888)
Tankerton Street, King's Cross (1892)
Meadows Dwellings - Mansford Street (1894)
Ravenscroft Dwellings - Columbia Road (1897)
Dunstan Houses - Stepney Green (1899)
Whidborne Buildings - Tonbridge Street, Kings Cross (1890s)
Mendip Houses - Kirkwall Place, Bethnal Green (1900)
Shepton Houses (1900)
Merceron Houses (1901)
Montfort House (1901)
Gretton Houses (1901)
Thornhill Houses - Barnsbury (1902)
Evesham House - Old Ford (1905)
Globe Road/Cyprus Street block - Bethnal Green (1906)

See also
List of existing model dwellings

References

Further reading
Connor, JE and Critchley, BJ (1984) The Red Cliffs of Stepney: History of Buildings erected by the East End Dwellings Co. 1885-1949, Connor and Butler
O'Day, Rosemary (2004). Caring or controlling? The East End of London in the 1880s and 1890s. In: Emsley, Clive; Johnson, Eric and Spierenburg, Pieter eds. Social control in Europe: Volume 2, 1800-2000. Columbus, Ohio, USA: Ohio State University Press, pp. 149–166.

Philanthropic organisations based in the United Kingdom
Housing organisations based in London
Model dwellings
Organizations established in 1882
1882 establishments in England
Companies based in the London Borough of Tower Hamlets
British companies established in 1882